Visions of a New World is an album by keyboardist Lonnie Liston Smith, featuring performances recorded in 1975 and released by the Flying Dutchman label.

Reception

In his review for AllMusic, Thom Jurek stated, "On Visions of a New World, Smith, accompanied by his working unit the Cosmic Echoes, digs deeper into the soul-jazz vein that he had begun exploring ... In 1975, Smith was looking for a smoother, more soulful groove than he had displayed previously ... Despite these fiery players, the music here is strictly a late-night seduction/meditation groove ... Not exactly a flawless bid for Smith, but there are some shining moments nonetheless".

Track listing
All compositions by Lonnie Liston Smith except where noted
 "A Chance for Peace" − 5:18
 "Love Beams" − 4:07
 "Colors of the Rainbow" − 3:45
 "Devika (Goddess)" (Dave Hubbard) − 5:17
 "Sunset" − 4:10
 "Visions of a New World (Phase I)" − 2:08
 "Visions of a New World (Phase II)" − 3:40
 "Summer Nights" − 5:05

Personnel
Lonnie Liston Smith − keyboards
Donald Smith − vocals, flute (tracks 1-3, 5, 6 & 8)
Cecil Bridgewater − trumpet (tracks 1 & 7)
Clifford Adams  − trombone (tracks 1 & 7)
Dave Hubbard − soprano saxophone, horns (tracks 1, 2, 4, 5 & 8)
Reggie Lucas − guitar (tracks 1 & 7)
Greg Maker − electric bass (tracks 1, 2, 4, 5, 7 & 8)
Art Gore, Wilby Fletcher − drums (tracks 1, 2, 4, 5, 7 & 8)
Lawrence Killian − congas, percussion (tracks 1, 2, 4, 5, 7 & 8)
Angel Allende − bongos, percussion (tracks 1-5, 7 & 8)
Michael Carvin (tracks 1, 2, 4, 5, 7 & 8), Ray Armando (tracks 1-5, 7 & 8) − percussion

References

1975 albums
Albums produced by Bob Thiele
Flying Dutchman Records albums
RCA Records albums
Jazz-funk albums
Lonnie Liston Smith albums
Albums recorded at Electric Lady Studios